The 2009–10 Ukrainian Second League was the 19th season of 3rd level professional football in Ukraine. The competitions were divided into two groups according to geographical location in the country – A is western Ukraine and B is eastern Ukraine. Due to the 2009 flu pandemic which affected Ukraine in late October the PFL decide to break for winter earlier than they originally scheduled. The second half of the season began March 14, 2009.

Competition information 
Note: Relegation from the League is not covered by the current regulations

The placing of teams in the table is done in the following order:
 number of accumulated points
 difference(GD) between goals for(GF) and goals allowed(GA)
 number of goals for
 The League Fair-play ranking

The next tie-break is a simple draw.

Team changes

Admitted teams 
The following team was promoted from the 2009 Ukrainian Football Amateur League:
 FC Morshyn – first group stage participant (debut)

Also, one reserve team was admitted:
 FC Lviv-2 – (debut)

Relegated teams 
No teams were relegated from the 2008–09 Ukrainian First League due to team withdrawal.

Group A

Location map

Final standings

Withdrawn teams

CSCA Kyiv 

CSCA Kyiv ceased its operation and withdrew from the League after the 5th Round on September 4, 2009 due to financial hardship. All of their results were annulled. They played three games in the League and had a record of 1 win and 2 losses with 6 goals scored and 6 allowed. The club was also docked 3 points by the PFL on August 27, 2009 due to failure of payment of league dues.

Top goalscorers

Group B

Location map

Final standings

Expelled teams

Dnipro-75 Dnipropetrovsk 

Dnipro-75 Dnipropetrovsk was expelled from the League just prior to the 16th Round on March 18, 2010 due to the inability to pay the spring season dues. All of their spring fixtures are considered technical losses. The club played fifteen games in the League and had a record of 4 wins, 5 draws and 6 losses with 19 goals scored and 21 allowed. Stanislav Kulish was the top scorer with 6 goals of which 3 were scored from the penalty spot.

Top goalscorers

Playoff game 
At the meeting of the Professional Football League of Ukraine after the season, it was confirmed that Ukrainian First League team FC Desna Chernihiv failed attestation and hence would have their license withdrawn. To allow an extra team to be promoted, the PFL determined that a playoff game between the 2nd placed teams from Druha Liha –
Kremin Kremenchuk and Nyva Vinnytsia would determine the vacancy created. This playoff game was played June 28, 2010.

Stadia 

Notes:
  CMS stands for Central Municipal Stadium, the name of a stadium that doesn't carry any official names, and followed by the city's name where the stadium is located. Usually such stadiums are the property of the city with a generic name "Tsentralnyi" (Central, in Ukrainian)
  Yednist Plysky also played at SKOR Stadium in Obukhiv, Kyiv Oblast (province) and Spartak Stadium in Nizhyn, Chernihiv Oblast.

See also 
 2009–10 Ukrainian Premier League
 2009–10 Ukrainian First League
 2009–10 League Cup (Ukraine)

References 

Ukrainian Second League seasons
3
Ukra